Svetlana Isakova (born 18 February 1952) is a Soviet alpine skier. She competed in three events at the 1972 Winter Olympics.

References

1952 births
Living people
Soviet female alpine skiers
Olympic alpine skiers of the Soviet Union
Alpine skiers at the 1972 Winter Olympics
People from Murmansk
Sportspeople from Murmansk Oblast